The Forward Thrust ballot initiatives were a series of bond propositions put to the voters of King County, Washington in 1968 and 1970, designed by a group called the Forward Thrust Committee. Seven of the twelve propositions in 1968 were successful; four of the remaining propositions were repackaged for a vote in 1970, when they were defeated in the darkening local economic climate of the Boeing Bust.  One of the most visible accomplishments of the Forward Thrust levy was the eventual building of the Kingdome, ultimately the first home of the Seattle Seahawks and Seattle Mariners.

The initiatives were variously under the aegis of METRO (the Municipality of Metropolitan Seattle), King County, and the city of Seattle. (METRO and King County merged in 1992.) The Forward Thrust Committee was founded by James R. Ellis and effectively disbanded shortly after the 1970 defeats. It disbanded formally in 1974. Seattle Mayor Dorm Braman was also a strong backer of the 1968 initiatives.

The US$118 million passed in 1968 in support of the Department of Parks and Recreation was, at the time, the largest parks and recreation bond issue ever passed in the United States.

The failure of the rapid transit propositions meant that a nearly $900 million federal funding earmark that had been secured  by U.S. Senator Warren Magnuson if local bonds passed went instead to fund Atlanta, Georgia's MARTA.

Results
The elections took place February 13, 1968, and May 19, 1970. Each initiative required a 60% supermajority to pass. The results were as follows; bold typeface indicates successful propositions:

Sources:

See also
King County Metro

Notes

External links
 Preliminary Guide to the Forward Thrust Records 1966-1970, University of Washington Library (July 2019 archive.org snapshot)
 https://archiveswest.orbiscascade.org/ark:/80444/xv52255/op%3Dfstyle.aspx?t=k&q=WAUForwardThrustSeattleWash1707.xml — University of Washington archive (as of July 2022)

History of Seattle
Washington (state) elections
1968 Washington (state) ballot measures
1970 Washington (state) ballot measures